Oldoini is a surname. Notable people with the surname include:

 Augustino Oldoini (1612–1683), Italian Jesuit teacher, church historian, and bibliographer
 Enrico Oldoini (born 1946), Italian director and screenwriter
 Virginia Oldoini, Countess of Castiglione (1837–1899), Italian aristocrat